Smorodino is a rural locality (a selo) in Lapshinskoye Rural Settlement, Kotovsky District, Volgograd Oblast, Russia. The population was 216 as of 2010. There are 4 streets.

Geography 
Smorodino is located in steppe, on Volga Upland, on the right bank of the Sukhaya Olkhovka River, 28 km east of Kotovo (the district's administrative centre) by road. Lapshinskaya is the nearest rural locality.

References 

Rural localities in Kotovsky District